Dolgoderevenskoye is a rural locality (a selo) and the administrative center of Sosnovsky District, Chelyabinsk Oblast, Russia. Its population was

References

Notes

Sources

Rural localities in Chelyabinsk Oblast